Bolna is a duet song sung by Arijit Singh and Asees Kaur. The music is composed by Tanishk Bagchi and the lyrics are penned by Dr. Devender Kafir. It is one of the songs from the soundtrack of the film Kapoor & Sons. The song has been described as beautiful, soulful and melodious.

Upon its release the song created stir on the digital platform and was described as "the love song of 2016 Spring season". Tanishk Bagchi and Asees Kaur won 2017 Mirchi Music Awards for Upcoming Music Composer of The Year and Upcoming Female Vocalist of The Year respectively.

Accolades

References 

2016 songs
Songs written for films
Hindi film songs
Arijit Singh songs
Songs written by Tanishk Bagchi